is a Japanese fencer. He competed in the men's sabre event at the 2016 Summer Olympics.

References

External links
 

1987 births
Living people
Sportspeople from Fukui Prefecture
Japanese male sabre fencers
Nippon Sport Science University alumni
Fencers at the 2016 Summer Olympics
Fencers at the 2020 Summer Olympics
Olympic fencers of Japan
Fencers at the 2014 Asian Games
Fencers at the 2018 Asian Games
Asian Games competitors for Japan
20th-century Japanese people
21st-century Japanese people